Alejandro 'Álex' Colorado Ramírez (born 9 June 1984 in Jerez de la Frontera, Cádiz) is a Spanish footballer who plays for Xerez CD as a left winger.

External links

 

1984 births
Living people
Spanish footballers
Footballers from Jerez de la Frontera
Association football wingers
Segunda División players
Segunda División B players
Tercera División players
Tercera Federación players
Real Madrid C footballers
Xerez CD footballers
Granada CF footballers
AD Ceuta footballers
Orihuela CF players
UE Lleida players
Albacete Balompié players
Lleida Esportiu footballers
CF Reus Deportiu players
UE Costa Brava players
Xerez Deportivo FC footballers